NGC 290 is an open cluster of stars in the southern constellation of Tucana. This cluster was discovered September 5, 1826 by Scottish astronomer James Dunlop.  It lies some 200,000 light years away from the Sun in the Small Magellanic Cloud galaxy. The cluster is an estimated 30–63 million years old and is around 65 light years across.

See also 
 NGC 265

References

External links 
 
 HubbleSite NewsCenter: Information on NGC 290 and the Hubble picture

NGC 0290
Small Magellanic Cloud
NGC 0290
0290
18340411